Bill Troiano is an American tuba player from Long Island, New York. He was a member of the Guy Lombardo Orchestra from 1976-78. In 1975, Howard organized the first SCMEA OcTubafest. In 1980, he was asked to lead the continuation of the OcTubafest tradition in Suffolk County. Also known as "Mr. Tuba," Troiano has been the chairman of the annual Howard Hovey Tuba Day since 1980.

Troiano has played in ensembles such as The Atlantic Wind Symphony, The Guy Lombardo Orchestra, The Sunnyland Jazz Trio, and the Huntington Community Band.

Until 2003, Troiano was the director of a high school brass band called Students of Music Incorporated. They performed at venues such as Shea Stadium and West Point.

The Long Island Tuba Quartet 
The Long Island Tuba Quartet was created in 1986 to perform at the 6th Howard Hovey Tuba Day. The brass quartet consists of two euphoniums and two tubas. Troiano and former student Jeff Furman play tuba while Michael Canipe of the Deer Park School District and Don Sherman of East Northport play euphonium.

Since 1986, the Long Island Tuba Quartet has made annual appearances at the Tuba Festival. The quartet has performed in many parts of New York state, but mostly on Long Island. They have been known to play at churches, parks, weddings, private parties, libraries, retirement homes, schools, beaches, and craft fairs. Aside from the often-comedic introduction of their next song to be played, the group can also surprise by playing Handel's beautiful "Water Music", then segue into Edgar Winter's "Frankenstein."

References

External links 
 SCMEA
 Tuba News
 Howard Hovey Tuba Day
 Long Island Tuba Quartet

1951 births
People from Plainview, New York
American tubists
Living people
21st-century tubists